William Charles Dodge (born 10 March 1937 in Hackney, London) is an English former professional footballer who played for Eton Manor, Tottenham Hotspur and Crystal Palace.

Playing career
Dodge began his career at non-League club Eton Manor before joining Tottenham Hotspur in October, 1957. In January, 1959 after a string of poor results Spurs manager, Bill Nicholson dropped legendary Danny Blanchflower in a favour of the younger Dodge (the first of 57 players to be given their club debut by Nicholson) who played in a more defensive role. The decision prompted the Northern Ireland international to request a transfer. However, the White Hart Lane club were knocked out of the FA Cup by giantkillers Norwich City on 15 February 1959. After this shock result, Blanchflower was reinstated and appointed team captain a fortnight later. Dodge featured in ten matches in all competitions in 1959 with the Lilywhites. He transferred to Crystal Palace in July, 1962 where he notched up a further three appearances.

He went on to play non-league football with Kettering Town and Ashford Town (Kent) for whom he had a 100% league appearance record over five years, and in his overall stay at Ashford a total of 425 appearances in all competitions.

References

External links
Dodge's Spurs debut

1937 births
Living people
Footballers from Hackney Central
English footballers
Association football wing halves
Eton Manor F.C. players
Tottenham Hotspur F.C. players
Crystal Palace F.C. players
Ashford United F.C. players
Kettering Town F.C. players
English Football League players